The president of the Republic of Suriname is, in accordance with the Constitution of 1987, the head of state and head of government of Suriname, and commander-in-chief of the Suriname National Army (SNL). The president also appoints a cabinet.

The current president is Chan Santokhi, a former chief of police. He is affiliated with the Progressive Reform Party (VHP). Santokhi was elected on 13 July 2020 as president by acclamation in an uncontested election, and inaugurated on 16 July on the Onafhankelijkheidsplein in Paramaribo in a ceremony without the public presence due to the COVID-19 pandemic.

History
The office of president was created upon independence from the Netherlands in 1975. Until 1987, the role was largely ceremonial. The first officeholder was Johan Ferrier, a schoolteacher and veteran politician who had served as governor since 1968. He resigned as president in August 1980, several months after a coup d'état. From then until 1988, the presidents were essentially army-installed puppets of Lt. Col. Bouterse, who ruled as a dictator with few practical checks on his power. Democracy was restored in 1988, the year after the adoption of the constitution, in which the duties and responsibilities of the president were included. On 24 December 1990, two days after Bouterse's resignation as army commander, the army called president Ramsewak Shankar to inform him that he and his cabinet were removed from office. Police Chief and Acting Commander of the Army Ivan Graanoogst was appointed acting president. On 27 December 1990, Johannes Kraag became the president. Since 1991, the president is elected democratically.

Election
The president and a vice president are elected by no less than a two-thirds supermajority of members in the National Assembly to a five-year mandate and are accountable to the Assembly. During their time in office, the president must forfeit any additional posts in politics or business.

Qualification
A candidate must be a Surinamese national (resident in the country for at least six years) who is at least 30 years of age.  A candidate must win at least two-thirds of the votes in the Assembly to be elected.  If no candidate wins two-thirds after three rounds, the vote then goes to the United People's Congress, composed of the Assembly and local government officials. In this case, a simple majority is required.

Powers and duties
The president is vested with extensive functional powers. The president names and dismisses ministers, signs bills, and names and dismisses diplomatic staff. He declares war and states of emergency with the ratification of the National Assembly. He concludes foreign treaties and agreements, again with the assent of the Assembly. He also exercises ceremonial duties such as conferring awards, receiving foreign diplomats, and granting pardons.

List of presidents

Political parties

Timeline

See also
 Politics of Suriname
 First Lady of Suriname
 List of colonial governors of Suriname
 Vice President of Suriname
 List of prime ministers of Suriname
 List of deputy prime ministers of Suriname

Notes

References

External links
  Kabinet van de President van de Republiek Suriname
  Constitution of the Republic of Suriname, 1987

Suriname
 
Presidents
1975 establishments in Suriname